SALH may refer to:
 Semi-active laser homing, a form of laser guidance
 South African Light Horse, a former British Army unit established in the Cape Colony during the Boer War
 South Alberta Light Horse, a reserve armoured-reconnaissance regiment of the Canadian Army based in Alberta